The eighth full elections for Guildford Borough Council took place on 6 May 1999.

The Liberal Democrats had won control of the council in May 1995 with a majority of 1.  However the first half of 1997 had seen the Liberal Democrats lose their majority as a result of three councillors (2 Stoughton councillors and 1 from Tongham) resigning from the party and a by election defeat in Merrow & Burpham ward.

Going into the election there were 19 Liberal Democrats, 14 Conservatives, 6  Labour and 6 independents.  These 6 independents formed three distinct groups.  There were 3 councillors for Ash and Tongham wards (two of whom were former Liberal Democrat councillors, one having resigned from the party in the 1991-95 session and one during the 1995-1999 session) who classed themselves as the "Independent Group".  Two former Liberal Democrat councillors representing Stoughton ward classed themselves as Liberals.  The councillor for Tillingbourne classed himself as an independent councillor.

The May 1999 election saw 20 Liberal Democrats, 17 Conservatives, 6 Labour and 2 Independents elected.  The council remained hung.

The Liberal Democrats gained 1 net seat (3 losses and 4 gains) on the position they held going into the election.  The Liberal Democrats lost 3 seats to the west of the borough, 2 in Ash ward and 1 in Normandy.  The Liberal Democrats retook the Merrow & Burpham seat which they had lost to the Conservatives in a by election in May 1997, plus they retook the 2 Stoughton seats which they had lost to resignations in February 1997.  The Liberal Democrats also gained Effingham ward from the Conservatives.

The Conservatives made 3 net gains (2 losses and 5 gains) on the position which they held going into the election.  The Conservatives lost the Merrow & Burpham seat which they had taken in the May 1997 by election.  The Conservative also lost Effingham to the Liberal Democrats.  The Conservatives gained 2 Ash Vale seats from the Independent Group, plus they gained from the Liberal Democrats 3 of the other seats in the west of the borough, 2 in Ash and 1 in Normandy.

The Independent Group did not contest its 2 seats in Ash Vale.  These were gained by the Conservatives.  The one member of the Independent Group who did contest his seat held on to it in Tongham.  Neither councillor belonging to the Liberal Group sought reelection in Stoughton and the Liberal Democrats regained these two seats.

Relative to 1995, the changes were not as dramatic as they were relative to the position going into the election.  Overall there was a shift to the Conservatives in the Ash and Normandy region to the west of the borough, but much less change between the parties elsewhere in the borough.  The Liberal Democrats lost all their remaining seats in the Ash, Tongham and Normandy region, having won all 7 of the seats there as recently as 1991.  After the election the Ash, Tongham and Normandy area had 1 independent and 6 Conservative councillors.  Elsewhere in the borough the only seat to change hands relative to 1995 was Effingham, where a Conservative marginal, was captured by the Liberal Democrats.

Results

References

1999
1999 English local elections
1990s in Surrey